The Khukhrain or Khokhrain is a clan composed of eight septs of the Khatri caste that originally hailed from the areas of the Salt Range.

Battle of Bhera
The Khukhrains spread over Khushab, Dhune Kheb, Chakwal, Pind Dadan Khan, Peshawar, Nowshera and Lahore. They were a powerful tribe during the attacks of Mahmud of Ghazni and resisted him during his third invasion after the defeat of Jayapala at the Battle of Bhera in 1004-5. Bhera was the Khukhrain capital.

When Bhera was sacked by Mahmud of Ghazni, the Khukhrain king, Biji Rai preferred to commit suicide using his dagger rather than submit to Mahmud Ghaznavi. Jaipal's son, Anandapala, received support of the Khukhrains against the Ghazni rule in 1008-9 at Wahind.

Religious beliefs
The Khukhrain clan was originally Hindu. Later clan members embraced Sikhism and Islam. Khukhrains of all these faiths collectively form one kinship. In Pakistan there continues to be a large number of Muslim Khukhrains living especially in the Pakistani Punjab.. Some scholars such as Muhammad Ikrām Chutai believe that a number of  Khukhrains were converted to Islam by the Sufi Baba Farid.

Clans 

 Anand : Named after a common ancestor "Ananda" which translates to "joy" in Sanskrit.
 Bhasin : They were mostly concentrated in Rawalpindi district (1208 families) according to 1881 Census of India conducted by British.
 Chadha : According to a local account, the ancestors of Chadhas fought with Babur in a war. However, all of them died except for one man who hid behind an aak bush. This person continued the progeny of the Chadha clan. To pay tribute to the aak bush which saved the Chadha clan from extinction, the Chadhas visit Eminabad in Gujranwala district to perform prayers and worship the Aak tree as a former tradition
 Chandhoke (Chandhok) : They were concentrated in Peshawar and Kabul.
 Ghai :They are mentioned in Bhai Gurdas's Vaar 11                                                                                                                                                                                                                                ਵਡਾ ਭਗਤੁ ਹੈ ਭਾਈਅੜਾ ਗੋਇੰਦੁ ਘੇਈ ਗੁਰੂ ਦੁਆਰੇ। (Translation : Bhaiara and Govind are devotees belonging to Ghai sub-caste. They remain at the door of the Guru.)
 Kohli : The Prakrit word "Koh" means a mountain and they lived in the hilly tracks of Hazara and Rawalpindi.
 Sabharwal : The sub-caste is also mentioned in Bhai Gurdas's Vaar 11                                                                                                                                                                         "ਸਨਮੁਖ ਭਾਈ ਤੀਰਥਾ ਸਭਰਵਾਲ ਸਭੇ ਸਿਰਦਾਰਾ।"  (Translation : Bhai Tirtha was the leader among all the Sikhs of Sabharval sub- caste.) 
 Sahni (Sawhney) :The Sahnis were the inhabitants of Bhera town located on the eastern bank of Jhelum River prior to the partition of India. Sahni families were also the governors of Wazirabad tehsil. According to B.N Puri, Sahni is derived from "Senani" meaning "general of an army"
 Sethi : According to B.N Puri, Sethi is derived from "shrestha" meaning "the headman"
 Suri : As per B.N Puri, Suri translates to "hero"

Khokran and Khokhars
Encyclopædia Britannica notes that: "The Khukhrain sub-group of the "52"s claims descent from a son of Manu and several clan names are traced to military terms in support of the claim to Kshatriya descent.."

See also
Hinduism in Punjab

References

Khatri clans